Vigna vexillata, the Zombi pea or wild cowpea, is a variable, perennial climbing plant that is pantropical, found in regions such as Ethiopia, Nigeria, and Venezuela.

Description
Vigna vexillata is a strong twiner with fusiform, tuberous roots. Its stems are usually clothed with brownish silky hairs, or trichomes.. The leaflets are all a dark green and with appressed trichomes on both surfaces. The flowers are sweetly scented.

The stems tend to scramble over the ground and twine into the surrounding vegetation. It has good seedling vigor and good wet-season growth, and is effective in weed suppression. The seed shatters and it is not a good standover feed for the dry season. It is susceptible to both frost and fire. Although hairy, the plant is quite palatable.

Habitat and ecology
Vigna vexillata thrives in a wide range of conditions, mostly in grasslands and in disturbed areas, as well as a weed.

Uses
The plant is a very important food crop in several areas, such as Namibia, where it is commonly harvested from the wild for local use. Its use has spread beyond its native range and the plant is now sometimes cultivated for its edible tubers. It is also grown as a green manure and ground cover crop, especially in poor soils.

The root is consumed raw or cooked. The tubers have a soft, easily peeled skin and creamy flesh. They are boiled or roasted and are particularly rich in protein. The young leaves, young pods, and seeds are also cooked and eaten as a vegetable.

References

vexillata
Taxa named by Carl Linnaeus